Ian Vougioukas (alternate spelling: Ian Vouyoukas) (Greek: Ίαν Βουγιούκας; born May 31, 1985) is a Greek professional basketball player who last played for Panathinaikos of the Greek Basket League and the EuroLeague. He played college basketball in the United States, for Saint Louis University.

Early life and career
Vougioukas, who was born in London, England, started playing basketball in his native country of Greece, with the youth clubs of Aris Glyfadas, Kronos, and Ilysiakos. He then moved to the United States, to play college basketball. He stayed in the U.S. until the end of the 2006–07 season.

College career
While playing NCAA Division I college basketball with the Saint Louis Billikens, Vougioukas was named First-Team All-Atlantic 10 Conference and was ranked 14th in the A-10 in scoring, at 13.9 points per game, and sixth in rebounding, at 7.4 rebounds per game. One of his college highlights was a game-high 28 point performance, in a 65–64 double-overtime loss to Dayton, on March 3, 2007. In the same game, he also grabbed 11 rebounds.

Professional career
After college, Vougioukas signed a three-year contract with the Greek EuroLeague club Olympiacos Piraeus. He was loaned to Rethymno, and he played with the squad during the 2007–08 season. In 2008, he returned to Olympiacos.

Vougioukas was loaned again, this time to Greek club Panellinios, for the 2009–10 season. In 2010, he signed with Greek club Panathinaikos, to a 2-year €1,620,000 euros gross income (€900,000 net income) contract. With Panathinaikos, Vougioukas won the EuroLeague and Greek League championships in 2011. He also won the Greek Cup title with Panathinaikos, in 2012.

In July 2012, Vougioukas signed two-year deal with the Russian club UNICS Kazan, of the VTB United League. He signed a 2-year €2 million net income contract.

In September 2014, Vougioukas signed a one-year deal with the Turkish club Galatasaray, of the Turkish Super League. In December 2014, he left Galatasaray. On February 26, 2015, he signed with ratiopharm Ulm of the German Bundesliga, for the rest of the season.

On 8 September 2015, Vougioukas signed a one-year deal with the Lithuanian League club Žalgiris Kaunas. On 17 August 2016, Vougioukas signed a 1+1 deal with the Russian club Lokomotiv Kuban. On July 1, 2017, Lokomotiv officially opted out of their deal with Vougioukas.

On July 4, 2017, Vougioukas returned to his former team, Panathinaikos, signing a 1+1 deal with them. He was later named the team's captain for a brief stint, due to a suspension of Nick Calathes. On August 1, 2019, Vougioukas renewed his contract with Panathinaikos, once again signing a 1+1 deal. On July 16, 2020, Vougioukas and the Greens officially parted ways. However, he was reinstated to the team on September 19 of the same year.

National team career

Greek junior national team
Vougioukas was a member of the junior Greek national basketball teams. With Greece's junior national teams, he played at the 2001 FIBA Europe Under-16 Championship, the 2004 FIBA Europe Under-20 Championship, and the 2005 FIBA Europe Under-20 Championship. He also won the bronze medal at the 2003 FIBA Under-19 World Cup, and the silver medal at the 2005 FIBA Under-21 World Cup. He also won the silver medal at the 2009 Mediterranean Games, with Greece's under-26 national team.

Greek senior national team
As a member of the senior Greek national basketball team, Vougioukas played at the 2010 FIBA World Cup, and at the 2014 World Cup.

Personal life
Vougioukas' younger brother Alex, is also a professional basketball player. His cousin Vaso Vougiouka, is an Olympics fencer.

Career statistics

EuroLeague

|-
| style="text-align:left;"| 2008–09
| style="text-align:left;"| Olympiacos
| 7 || 0 || 2.2 || .333 || .000 || 1.000 || 0.3 || .0 || 0.1 || .0 || 0.6 || -0.1
|-
| style="text-align:left;background:#AFE6BA;"| 2010–11†
| style="text-align:left;" rowspan=2| Panathinaikos
| 22 || 7 || 8.0 || .550 || .000 || .649 || 1.1 || 0.2 || 0.2 || 0.4 || 4.1 || 3.9
|-
| style="text-align:left;"| 2011–12
| 23 || 1 || 12.0 || .549 || .000 || .671 || 2.2 || 0.5 || 0.3 || 0.7 || 7.2 || 8.1
|-
| style="text-align:left;"| 2014–15
| style="text-align:left;"| Galatasaray
| 9 || 2 || 9.3 || .348 || .000 || .667 || 1.9 || 1.0 || 0.1 || 0.2 || 2.4 || 3.1
|-
| style="text-align:left;"| 2015–16
| style="text-align:left;"| Žalgiris Kaunas
| 24 || 16 || 20.2 || .542 || .000 || .857 || 4.7 || 1.3 || 0.5 || 0.6 || 11.1 || 13.2
|-
| style="text-align:left;"| 2017–18
| style="text-align:left;" rowspan=2| Panathinaikos
| 33 || 3 || 8.1 || .631 || .000 || .784 || 1.6 || 0.4 || 0.2 || .0 || 3.7 || 4.1
|-
| style="text-align:left;"| 2018–19
| 21 || 2 || 10.1 || .607 || .000 || .750 || 1.9 || 0.8 || 0.1 || 0.2 || 4.1 || 5.2
|-
|- class="sortbottom"
| align="center" colspan="2"| Career
| 139 || 31 || 10.0 || .553 || .000 || .752 || 2.2 || 0.6 || 0.3 || 0.4 || 5.4 || 5.4

Awards and accomplishments

College
All-Atlantic 10 Conference First Team: (2006)

Pro career
 Greek League Best Young Player: (2008)
 3× Greek All Star Game: (2010, 2011, 2018)
 EuroLeague Champion: (2011)
 4× Greek League Champion: (2011, 2018, 2019, 2020)
 3x Greek Cup Winner: (2012, 2019, 2021)
 Russian Cup Winner: (2014)
 Lithuanian League Champion: (2016)

Greek junior national team
 2003 FIBA Under-19 World Cup: 
 2005 FIBA Under-21 World Cup: 
 2009 Mediterranean Games:

References

External links

 Ian Vougioukas at espn.com
 Ian Vougioukas at euroleague.net
 Ian Vougioukas at fiba.com
 Hellenic Basketball Federation Profile 
 

1985 births
Living people
2010 FIBA World Championship players
2014 FIBA Basketball World Cup players
BC UNICS players
BC Žalgiris players
Centers (basketball)
Competitors at the 2009 Mediterranean Games
Galatasaray S.K. (men's basketball) players
Greek Basket League players
Greek expatriate basketball people in the United States
Greek men's basketball players
Ilysiakos B.C. players
Mediterranean Games medalists in basketball
Mediterranean Games silver medalists for Greece
Olympiacos B.C. players
Panathinaikos B.C. players
Panellinios B.C. players
PBC Lokomotiv-Kuban players
Ratiopharm Ulm players
Rethymno B.C. players
Saint Louis Billikens men's basketball players
Basketball players from Athens